The Costa Rica worm snake (Amerotyphlops costaricensis) is a species of snake in the Typhlopidae family.

References

costaricensis
Reptiles described in 1963